John Malloy AKA FLuX (born September 19, 1975) is an American fine artist, illustrator, designer, and sequential artist. His fine art has been exhibited internationally, and employs a variety of media, including pen & ink, oil & acrylic paint, and digital. He is known for his unique signature painting style that juxtaposes a mesmerizing three-dimensional effect more lifelike than a photograph with painted, avant garde, and vividly colored graphics. His illustrations feature a hyper-realistic cartoonish style. His work has appeared in advertising, packaging, magazines, music, product, apparel, online, and in posters, with clients such as Puma, Apple, Peace Tea, Diesel, Focus Features, FX, Business Week and others. His paintings have been exhibited worldwide, in collections alongside Andy Warhol & Jeff Koons.

Early life 
Malloy was born and raised in Hanover Township, Pennsylvania, and began drawing at the age of 6. His father was a cemetery-caretaker and his mother a coal-miner’s daughter. He event earned a background in trompe-l'œil oil painting, and since has been self-taught in painting, pen & ink, design, and sequential art and design.

Illustration, Fine art, Sequential art, &  Design
Born in rural northern Pennsylvania to a cemetery caretaker and a coal-miner's daughter, John Malloy, AKA FLuX, began drawing at very young age. He later earned a background in old masters painting and graphic design, and has since been self-taught in fine art, illustration, comics, and design.

His illustrations have been featured in The Big Book of Contemporary Illustration, Spectrum, and Gestalten's Illusive 3 book of contemporary illustration. Since 2007 he has produced work for 55DSL (Diesel Clothing), The Internet, Paste Magazine, Business Week, Focus Features, Dawn Richard, Minus the Bear, and Fujifilm. He is also the logo designer and artist behind the original Peace Iced Tea. His work has earned numerous awards including Creativity International's Platinum & Bronze Awards, The Society of Illustrators Silver Award for his work on the groundbreaking The Village Bully, and Spectrum, and has been featured in The DieLine, Gestalten's Illusive, The Big Book of Contemporary Illustration, Juxtapoz, Beyond Illustration, Packaging of the World and other publications.

His fine art has been exhibited in galleries internationally in Los Angeles, NY, Baltimore, Washington DC, Seattle, Cambodia, Japan, Australia, China and the U.K. Some galleries include Gallery Nucleus, Modern Eden Gallery, La Luz de Jesus, Hive Gallery, Gallery 1988, Baton Rouge Gallery, The Cotton Candy Machine, Thinkspace Gallery, Gristle Gallery, & The Seavest Collection.

In Sequential Art first graphic novel, Amnesia (NBM Publishing; 2001), combined pen & ink, digital, and painted media. He returned to the sequential/comics medium in 2007, concepting and illustrating sequential-art rock interviews for Lemon Magazine, and is currently at work on his autobiographical graphic novel titled Queasy [an excerpt appears in Image Comics' Popgun Anthology], and "Good", a graphic memoir about and co-authored by half-Yanomami American, David Good.

In Design he is the designer and Creative Director behind the original Peace Iced Tea, the energy drink Adrenaline Shoc, and has worked with other brands including OOLY, Prismacolor, Sharpie, Monster Energy, and others.

References

External links
John Malloy Official Webpage
Interview with Art Nectar
Feature on The Die Line
LA Weekly Review of 'Another Dimension' exhibit at Gallery 1988
Interview in Grab Magazine (Italy)
Review in Juxtapoz
Lemon Magazine
Interview in New Web Pick Magazine #16
Interview & Reviews at Lostateminor

1975 births
American illustrators
Game artists
Living people